Chris Grace may refer to:

Chris Grace (broadcaster) (born 1946), British broadcaster, film director and founder and former CEO of The Shakespeare Schools Festival
Chris Grace (actor), American actor and scriptwriter
Topher Grace (born 1978), American actor also known as Chris Grace

See also
 Grace (disambiguation)
 Gracie (disambiguation)